Sir Colin John Humphreys,  (born 24 May 1941) is a British physicist. He is the Professor of Materials Science at Queen Mary University of London. He is the former Goldsmiths' Professor of Materials Science at the University of Cambridge and the Professor of Experimental Physics at the Royal Institution in London. He served as President of the Institute of Materials, Minerals and Mining in 2002 and 2003. His research interests include "all aspects of electron microscopy and analysis, semiconductors (particularly gallium nitride), ultra-high temperature aerospace materials and superconductors." Humphreys also "studies the Bible when not pursuing his day-job as a materials scientist."

Education
Humphreys was educated at Luton Grammar School, Imperial College London (BSc) and Churchill College, Cambridge where he was awarded a PhD in 1969. He was awarded a Master of Arts degree from Jesus College, Oxford.

Career and research

Semiconductors 
Humphreys is a materials scientist who has carried out valuable work on the electron microscopy of semiconducting materials. His world-leading research on gallium nitride (GaN) has resulted in a substantially improved understanding of this important material with a wide range of technological applications.

In addition to its potential use within transistors as a next-generation alternative to silicon, GaN emits a brilliant light that makes it an ideal candidate for use in energy-saving LEDs. Colin has pioneered the development of low-cost, high-efficiency GaN-on-silicon (or ‘GaN-on-Si’) LEDs, which are now being manufactured based on his patented research. GaN LED lighting could save the United Kingdom £2 billion per year in electricity costs.

Humphreys is a member of the John Templeton Foundation. and a member of the Advisory Council for the Campaign for Science and Engineering.

Biblical studies

Date of Last Supper
In 2011 Humphreys claimed in his book The Mystery of the Last Supper that the Last Supper took place on Wednesday (Holy Wednesday), not as traditionally thought Thursday (Maundy Thursday), and that the apparent timing discrepancies (Nisan 15 or 14) between the gospels of Matthew, Mark, and Luke versus John are rooted in the use of different calendars by the writers. Mark, Matthew and Luke appear to use an older, Egyptian-style Jewish calendar (still used today by the Samaritans) while John appears to refer to the newer, Babylonian-style Jewish calendar (still in use by modern Jews). The Last Supper being on Wednesday would allow more time for interrogation and presentation to Pilate prior to the crucifixion on Friday than given in the traditional view. Humphreys proposed the actual date for the Last Supper to be 1 April 33.

Criticism
In a review of Humphreys' book, theologian William R Telford points out that the non-astronomical parts of his argument are based on the assumption that the chronologies described in the New Testament are historical and based on eyewitness testimony, accepting statements such as the "three different Passovers in John" and Matthew's statement that Jesus died at the ninth hour. In doing so, Telford says, Humphreys has built an argument upon unsound premises which "does violence to the nature of the biblical texts, whose mixture of fact and fiction, tradition and redaction, history and myth all make the rigid application of the scientific tool of astronomy to their putative data a misconstrued enterprise."

Eclipse made "sun stand still"
In a 2017 paper written together with Graeme Waddington, Humphreys offered an astronomical explanation for the biblical story of the sun standing still over Gibeon during the Israelites' victorious battle against the Amorites, namely an annular eclipse which occurred on 30 October 1207 BCE.

Awards and honours
Humphreys was elected in 1996 as a Fellow of the Royal Academy of Engineering
He won the Institute of Physics Kelvin Medal and Prize in 2000.
Humphreys was awarded the A. A. Griffith Medal and Prize in 2001 and a CBE in 2003 for services to science as a researcher and communicator.
He was knighted in the 2010 Birthday Honours and in 2011 elected a Fellow of the Royal Society
In 2015 he was elected as an Honorary Fellow of the Royal Microscopical Society.
He is also mentioned in Debrett's People of Today.

Bibliography
 The Miracles of Exodus: a Scientist Reveals the Extraordinary Natural Causes Underlying the Biblical Miracles (Harper Collins, 2003).
 "The Mystery of the Last Supper: Reconstructing the Final Days of Jesus." (Cambridge University Press, 2011)

References

1941 births
Living people
20th-century British physicists
21st-century British physicists
Alumni of Imperial College London
English physicists
English Christians
Fellows of the Royal Academy of Engineering
Fellows of the Institute of Physics
Fellows of Churchill College, Cambridge
Fellows of Selwyn College, Cambridge
Knights Bachelor
Commanders of the Order of the British Empire
Goldsmiths' Professors of Materials Science
Fellows of the Royal Society
Fellows of the Royal Microscopical Society
British materials scientists
Gibeon (ancient city)
Fellows of the Institute of Materials, Minerals and Mining